Paweł Łysiak (born 7 January 1996) is a Polish professional footballer who plays as a midfielder for Kotwica Kołobrzeg.

Career

At the age of 12, Łysiak debuted for Passat Bukowo Morskie in the Polish seventh division.

For the second half of 2013–14, he joined the youth academy of German Bundesliga side Wolfsburg amid offers from Roma in the Italian Serie A.

In 2016, he signed for German fourth division club Eichede from Kotwica Kołobrzeg in the Polish second division.

For the second half of 2017–18, Łysiak signed for Polish fifth division team Bałtyk Koszalin.

In 2020, he signed for Polish I liga side Korona Kielce.

References

External links
 Paweł Łysiak at 90minut

Polish footballers
Living people
1996 births
Association football midfielders
Poland youth international footballers
Wisła Płock players
Kotwica Kołobrzeg footballers
People from Koszalin
Gwardia Koszalin players
Błękitni Stargard players
Korona Kielce players
I liga players
II liga players
III liga players
Polish expatriate footballers
Expatriate footballers in Germany
Polish expatriate sportspeople in Germany